Riot in the Gallery is an artwork by the Italian painter Umberto Boccioni, one of the main figures of the futurist movement. This painting was created in 1910 and it was first called A Brawl (Una baruffa). Nowadays, this oil over canvas work, with dimensions of 74 × 64 cm., can be found in Milan in the Pinacoteca di Brera.

According to Vivien Greene (2014), “Riot in the Galleria depicts frenzied spectators around a shocking fight between two women—thought to be prostitutes—in Milan’s famous indoor mall, the Galleria Vittorio Emanuele II.”  The crowd represents the bourgeois of that time, and they seem chaotic and maybe even drunk. For Christine Poggi (2002) the movement of the two women generates, for the one hand, an entrapment of those who are near them, and for the other, a stampede that's trying to reach the center to watch the fight.

The futurist movement tends to focus on the modernization of the cities, and this can be seen in this painting. The location of the fight is a shopping mall, a site that represents consumption and entertainment. Even though Boccioni's artwork follows the futurism style, according to Charles Saatchi (2017), a subtle influence of pointillism can be read on this painting

References

External links
 Christine Poggi. (2002). Folla/Follia: Futurism and the Crowd. Critical Inquiry, Vol. 28, No. 3 (Spring 2002), pp. 709–748.
 Charles Saatchi. (2017). Charles Saatchi's Great Masterpieces: Umberto Boccioni reinvented how we see the city. The Telegraph.
 Vivien Greene. (2014). Futurism's Riots. February 14, 2020, Solomon R. Guggenheim Museum: Futurism’s Riots

Paintings by Umberto Boccioni
1910 paintings